Paul Andre Solinap Salas (born April 16, 1998), popularly known by his stage name Paul Salas, is a Filipino actor, model, and vlogger.

Early life
He is the eldest son of Michelle Solinap and Universal Motion dancer Jim Salas. He graduated from Starland International School in 2015.

Career
He also appeared in stage plays Lilo and Stitch and Sesame Street.

He started his career in 2004 through GMA Network's talent search StarStruck Kids, alongside Miguel Tanfelix, Sandy Talag, Bea Binene and among others. He starred in some GMA shows such as Mulawin.

On 2008, he transferred to ABS-CBN and cast to play Uragon in a live action fantasy series Kung Fu Kids. Following this, he appeared in as a young version of the main casts of various television series.

After almost 9 years of staying ABS-CBN, Salas returned to GMA Network in March 2018. He then signed a contract with GMA Artist Center on May 17, 2018.

Filmography

Film

Television

Awards

References

External links
 
 Sparkle GMA Artist Center profile
 

1998 births
Living people
People from Quezon City
Male actors from Iloilo
Visayan people
Hiligaynon people
Male actors from Metro Manila
Participants in Philippine reality television series
StarStruck Kids participants
Filipino male television actors
GMA Network personalities
ABS-CBN personalities
Star Magic